Fallen London, originally Echo Bazaar, is a browser-based interactive narrative game developed by Failbetter Games and set in "Fallen London", an alternative Victorian London with gothic overtones. The franchise subsequently expanded to other games, including Sunless Sea and its sequel Sunless Skies.

The game has been running continuously since October 2009. In June 2018, the website received a major graphical update, with a page redesign as well as better scaling across devices and HTTPS integration.

Setting 
Forty years ago London, First City of the British Empire, became the fifth city stolen into the Neath—a vast cavern beneath the earth. The city's streets twisted into a labyrinth centred on the Echo Bazaar, which serves as the centre of commerce and covets stories of love. While London retains a monarch, a parliament, and a mayor, the true power lies with the Masters of the Bazaar—cloaked inhuman beings who oversee domains of trade and enact mysterious agendas. Even physical laws lose their supremacy beyond the sunlight; clocks and maps can no longer be trusted, rats and cats wag tongues as well as tails, and death is often a temporary inconvenience, although at the cost of never seeing sunlight again.

While the industry, poverty, and high-class society of Victorian London remain, its strict social mores have been disrupted by strange new factions roaming its streets. Hell maintains an embassy in the city and trades in souls, to the consternation of the church. Artists and academics explore new possibilities unimaginable before the fall. Urchins, criminals, and revolutionaries hide from constables in the rooftops while hidden conflicts unfold below in shadows and reflections. Across the vast ocean of the Unterzee lies the Khanate empire, the impenetrable Elder Continent, and the screaming island of Polythreme, which exports clay labour to London.

Individuals mired in scandal are exiled to the Tomb Colonies, where the not-quite-dead live out their final days. Convicted criminals serve their sentence in New Newgate prison - constructed in a stalactite amongst the roof's false-stars. The temporarily deceased find themselves transported to a slow boat near the land of the dead. Those who succumb to nightmares and madness are welcomed to the Royal Bethlehem hotel or slip into a dream-realm, Parabola, which is closer to London than to surface locations and is sometimes visible through mirrors.

Gameplay 
Players take the role of new arrivals to the underground down on their luck, and make their way to the cream of the crop of the city's various legal and illegal activities. Players are gentlebeings of leisure, plumbing the vices and secrets of Fallen London. They have no living expenses, and though players may choose a profession for a periodic income, they can publish a newspaper, serve out repeated prison sentences and feed deliverymen to a man-eating plant without harming their job security.

Stats are used to track the player character's abilities and their position in the questlines; a character may accumulate hundreds. Four of these are the character's main attributes (Watchful, Shadowy, Dangerous, Persuasive) and constantly used for succeeding in actions, though failure may also increase the corresponding menace (Nightmares, Suspicion, Wounds, Scandal). If any menace rises too high, the character is removed to a side location (such as Disgraced exile in the Tomb-Colonies for Scandal) to work it off.

The game can't be won, but can be lost. A questline to "Seek Mr. Eaten's Name", about destructive obsession, requires the player to damage their character in like manner repeatedly, until its completion leaves the character permanently unplayable. The game requires players to opt into this questline and warns them against playing it.

Development
Alexis Kennedy began solo development of Fallen London as an amateur project in June 2009, creating the setting, building the site and writing the initial content. He had originally intended the game to be an entirely text-based experience, but quickly realised that art would enhance the project, and recruited a friend, Paul Arendt."Paul came on board because I wanted to write and code but I can't draw," says Kennedy. The original plan was to pay Arendt outright for his illustration work. "I said, 'I want to pay you as I want this to be a professional thing.' He said, 'Cut me in for a percentage,' and I said, 'Sure, that's great! I don't need to give you any money now! But you realise we're probably not going to make any actual money out of it?'" He claps his hands together. "We've been on salary for three years now, so... so that worked out."The site launched initially in October 2009 as an entirely free site, and introduced free-to-play elements in January 2010. Kennedy and Arendt recruited a number of other friends to write additional content, and over the years, the writing of Fallen London became a collective endeavour.

Fallen London is built on Failbetter's StoryNexus engine. Kennedy has explained that creating StoryNexus was the original motivation behind the creation of Fallen London. The company's plan was to develop StoryNexus as an open platform, but later described StoryNexus as a "failure".

Release 
Fallen London was released in 2009 as a browser game. An iOS and Android version was released in 2016, but was retired in 2018.

Reception 

Fallen London has received positive reviews, with much praise going to its writing and worldbuilding. Dan Zuccarelli of Gamezebo, calling the game "one of the best browser games [they'd] ever played", pointed to the game's "compelling but not overwhelming" story as its main feature. Rock, Paper, Shotgun's Adam Smith wrote in favour of its writing style along with its "inventive setting", "dripping with lore". He noted how most of the discovery comes from the player working things out for themselves.

Emily Short found it "almost entirely about setting". She gave credit to the quality of the game's prose and its "reasonably consistent" worldbuilding, though thought the game could be used for "something plottier". Short noted the "grinding" in the game, but found the daily time investment to play the game small enough to overlook its gameplay's "slightness". 

However, Short subsequently went on to become a writer for the game, and in late 2019 joined Failbetter as creative director.

The game won The Escapist "Best Browser-Based Game" award for the year 2009.

Spin-off media 

Sunless Sea and its sequel, Sunless Skies, are roguelike spin-offs of Fallen London.

On 22 September 2018, Failbetter Games released Skyfarer RPG, a rules light, highly narrative indie pen-and-paper role-playing game to accompany Sunless Skies.

Tales of Fallen London: The Silver Tree, a prequel to Fallen London, was released on 23 October 2012. The Silver Tree is also a browser-based choose-your-own-adventure game, but occurs roughly five hundred years before the time of Fallen London and focuses on the events surrounding the fall of the Fourth City, Karakorum, capital of the Mongol Empire. A tabletop game titled Knife & Candle (named for the competitive sport within the setting that combines elements of tag and a free-for-all murder spree) was in development, but John Harper stated that the game "didn't come together".

Failbetter are currently developing a new romantic visual novel set in the Fallen London universe called Mask of the Rose, which will serve as a prequel to the other games in the franchise.

References

External links 

2009 video games
Alternate history video games
Android (operating system) games
Browser games
Browser-based game websites
Gothic video games
IOS games
Steampunk video games
Video games developed in the United Kingdom
Video games set in London
Adventure games
Single-player video games